The 1935 German Grand Prix was a Grand Prix motor race held at the Nürburgring on 28 July 1935.

Classification

Race 
The 1935 event was considered to be one of the greatest motorsports victories of all time. The 1935 German Grand Prix will always be remembered as Tazio Nuvolari's greatest race. In a monumental drive, the Italian beat nine superior German Silver Arrows with an inferior red Alfa Romeo. The 1935 German Grand Prix at Nürbugring was held under chilling and dreadful conditions. An estimated 300,000 German fans including some of the most powerful and high ranking Third Reich officers showed up for the race that was run over the course of 22.8 km consisting of 174 turns. There were high expectations that one of the German drivers would win the race since they had the most powerful and advanced cars. Three Alfa-Romeos were presented by the Scuderia Ferrari team and were driven by Italian drivers Tazio Nuvolari and Antonio Brivio, along with Monegasque driver Louis Chiron. The rest of the competitors were from Maserati, ERA and Bugatti and were contested under private teams. Italian legend, Tazio Nuvolari's Alfa Romeo P3 Tipo B enjoyed the maximum engine capacity used in these cars, 3.2 litre, 290 bhp.

The race position was determined by a ballot and Tazio Nuvolari secured the front row at P2 but due to a poor start, Nuvolari dropped down to the third place with teammates Brivio retiring at lap 1 and Chiron at Lap 5 leaving Tazio with the only Alfa Romeo left competing in the race. Italian legend Tazio Nuvolari, drove a very hard race in appalling conditions, and after a dreadful start  was able to pass a number of cars, particularly while some of the German cars pitted. By lap 10, Nuvolari was already leading the race while the rest of the cars were struggling to maintain a grip on the now rain-soaked track. After a botched pit in which he lost a total of 2 minutes and 14 seconds due to refueling delays from a broken pressure pump, he joined the race at 6th place. He drove on the limit, made up the time and was 2nd by the start of the last lap- 35 seconds behind leader Manfred von Brauchitsch in a Mercedes. But von Brauchitsch had ruined his tyres by pushing very hard in the dreadful conditions- and Nuvolari was able to catch the German, passing him when one of von Brauchitsch's tyres blew out, and took victory in front of the stunned German High Command and 300,000 spectators. The small 42-year-old Italian ended up finishing in front of 8 running Silver Arrows- and 2nd placed Hans Stuck was 2 minutes behind Nuvolari.

For 1935, Nuvolari set his sights on a drive with the German Auto Union team. The team were lacking top-line drivers, but relented to pressure from Achille Varzi who did not want to be in the same teams as Nuvolari. Nuvolari then approached Enzo Ferrari, but was turned down as he had previously walked out on the team. However, Mussolini, the Italian prime minister, intervened and Ferrari backed down.

Manfred Von Brauchtisch the race leader at time was a full 35 seconds in the led at the start of the last lap. But Von Brauchtisch had been pushing so hard though to get the win that his tyres were totally destroyed and the great Nuvolari passed the German when the Germans tyres finally gave up and fell apart and Nuvolari took the chequered flag to win the race. Von Brauchtisch was nearly inconsolable but it was due to the pace of Nuvolari that the German had to drive so aggressively which was the German's downfall.

In this year, Nuvolari scored his most impressive victory, thought by many to be the greatest victory in car racing of all times, when at the German Grand Prix at the Nürburgring, driving an old Alfa Romeo P3 (3167 cc, 8C, compressor, 265 hp) versus the dominant, all conquering home team's cars of five Mercedes-Benz W25 (3990 cm3, 8C, compressor, 375 hp (280 kW)), driven by Caracciola, Fagioli, Hermann Lang, Manfred von Brauchitsch and Geyer) and four Auto Union Tipo B (4950 cc, 16C, compressor, 375 hp (280 kW)), driven by Bernd Rosemeyer, Varzi, Hans Stuck and Paul Pietsch). This victory is known as "The Impossible Victory". The crowd of 300,000 applauded Nuvolari, but the representatives of the Third Reich were frustrated and enraged.

Starting grid positions

Notes 
Ernst von Delius destroyed his car during practice, so shared Mays' car in the race.

References 

German Grand Prix
German Grand Prix
Grand Prix